In mathematics, the codomain or set of destination of a function is the set into which all of the output of the function is constrained to fall. It is the set  in the notation . The term range is sometimes ambiguously used to refer to either the codomain or image of a function.

The image of a function is a subset of its codomain so it might not coincide with it. Namely, a function that is not surjective has elements  in its codomain for which the equation  does not have a solution.

A codomain is not part of a function    if    is defined as just a graph. For example in set theory it is desirable to permit the domain of a function to be a proper class , in which case there is formally no such thing as a triple . With such a definition functions do not have a codomain, although some authors still use it informally after introducing a function in the form  .

Examples 
For a function

defined by
  or equivalently 

An alternative function  is defined thus: 
 
 

While  and  map a given  to the same number, they are not, in this view, the same function because they have different codomains. A third function  can be defined to demonstrate why:
 

The domain of  cannot be  but can be defined to be :
 

The compositions are denoted
 
 

On inspection,  is not useful.

Function composition therefore is a useful notion only when the codomain  of the function on the right side of a composition (not its image, which is a consequence of the function and could be unknown at the level of the composition) is a subset of the domain of the function on the left side.

The codomain affects whether a function is a surjection, in that the function is surjective if and only if its codomain equals its image.  In the example,  is a surjection while  is not.  The codomain does not affect whether a function is an injection.

Each matrix represents a map with the domain  and codomain . However, the image is uncertain. Some transformations may have image equal to the whole codomain (in this case the matrices with rank ) but many do not, instead mapping into some smaller subspace (the matrices with rank  or ). Take for example the matrix  given by

Just like all  matrices,  represents a member of that set. Examining the differences between the image and codomain can often be useful for discovering properties of the function in question. For example, it can be concluded that  does not have full rank since its image is smaller than the whole codomain.

See also 
 
 Morphism#Codomain

Notes

References 
  
 

 
 
 
 

Functions and mappings
Basic concepts in set theory